The  form one of two branches of the Ryukyuan languages. They are spoken on the Sakishima Islands in Okinawa Prefecture. The three languages are Miyako (on the Miyako Islands) and Yaeyama and Yonaguni (on the Yaeyama Islands, of the Macro-Yaeyama subgroup). The Macro-Yaeyama languages have been identified as "critically endangered" by UNESCO and Miyako as "definitely endangered".

All Ryukyuan languages are officially labeled as dialects of Japanese by the Japanese government despite mutual unintelligibility. While the majority of Ryukyuan languages have used Chinese or Japanese script for writing, the Yaeyama Islands never had a full-featured writing system. Islanders developed the Kaidā glyphs as a simple method to record family names, items, and numerals to aid in tax accounting. This system was used until the 19th century introduction of Japanese-language education. Even today, communication in the Yaeyama or Yonaguni languages is almost exclusively oral, and written communication is done in Japanese.

Reconstruction
Proto-Sakishima, the proto-language ancestral to the Southern Ryukyuan languages, has been reconstructed by Bentley (2008).

References

Languages of Japan
Ryukyuan languages
Ryukyu Islands
Culture in Okinawa Prefecture